Dodhara is a village development committee in Kanchanpur District in the Sudurpashchim Province of south-western Nepal. At the time of the 1991 Nepal census it had a population of 12,385 people living in 2240 individual households. Mainly Brahmins, ksheris mostly western community. The main Language is Doteli.

Media/communication
NTC, Sky (CDMA), NT 3G (Nepal telecom), Ncell are giving services currently.
( Hello Nepal is under construction).

References

Populated places in Kanchanpur District